Nerežišća is a village on the island Brač in Croatia. It has a population of 862 (2011 census). Of these, 98% are Croats.

In the past, Nerežišća was the capital of the island. It was founded inside the island, not on its coast, because of fear of pirates marauding the Adriatic Sea. Once these pirates were eradicated by the Venetians, the locals started populating the settlements by the sea, especially Supetar and Sutivan, across the Brač Channel facing Split.

References

External links 

Municipalities of Croatia
Brač
Populated places in Split-Dalmatia County